Albert Mkrtchyan (February 27, 1937 – February 28, 2018) was an Armenian film director, screenwriter, actor, and recipient of the People's Artist of the Republic of Armenia award (2003).

He was the younger brother of Soviet actor Frunzik Mkrtchyan.

Biography
Albert Mkrtchyan was born in 1937 in Leninakan. In 1960, Albert Mkrtchyan graduated from the Yerevan Fine Arts and Theatre Institute and in 1971, from the Gerasimov Institute of Cinematography in Moscow. 
From 1960 to 1966, he served as the director of the Armenian TV studio and since 1971, he had been the director of Hayfilm studio. From 1995 to 1999 he was the director of the Gyumri Drama Theater, and since 2000, Mkrtchyan had been the director and artistic director of the Mher Mkrtchyan Artistic Theater.

Mkrtchyan had been a lecturer at the Armenian State Pedagogical University after Khachatur Abovyan and Yerevan State Institute of Theater and Cinema.

Films

As an actor

Awards
 Movses Khorenatsi medal, 2000
 People's Artist of the Republic of Armenia, 2003 
 Special Award at the "Hayak" Armenian Movie Awards

References

External links
 
 Albert Mkrtchyan at AlloCiné

1937 births
2018 deaths
People from Gyumri
Armenian film directors